Carl Jensen may refer to:
 Carl Jensen (boxer) (1909–1991), Danish boxer
 Carl Jensen (painter) (1887–1961), Danish painter and newspaper illustrator
 Carl Jensen (politician) (1920–1988), Minnesota politician
 Carl Jensen (wrestler) (1882–1942), Danish sport wrestler and Olympic medalist
 Carl B. Jensen, U.S. Marine Corps general
 Carl Fredrik Jensen (1855–1929), Norwegian judge and civil servant
 Carl Jóhan Jensen (born 1957), Faroese writer, poet and literary critic

See also

 Karl Jensen (disambiguation)